Zecchini is a surname. Notable people with the surname include:

Alessia Zecchini (born 1992), Italian freediver
Giuseppe Zecchini (born 1952), Italian historian
Lino Zecchini (born 1928), Italian alpine skier
Luciano Zecchini (born 1949), Italian footballer and coach